The Battle That Made Britain is a 2006 BBC Television documentary telling the Battle of Culloden.

BBC television documentaries about history during the 18th and 19th centuries